George Pierce Ikirt (November 3, 1852 – February 12, 1927) was an American physician and politician who served one term as a United States representative from Ohio from 1893 to 1895.

Early life and education 
He was born near West Beaver (southeast of Gavers in Wayne Township) in Columbiana County, Ohio. He attended the public schools of New Lisbon, Ohio.  He taught school and studied law, but on account of ill health was compelled to abandon both.

Career
He later attended Columbus Medical College, moved to Cincinnati, and graduated from the Cincinnati College of Medicine and Surgery in 1877.  He practiced for five years.  He later went to New York City in 1882 and was graduated from the Bellevue Hospital Medical College in 1883.  He then again resumed practice in East Liverpool, Ohio.

Congress 
Ikirt was an unsuccessful candidate for election in 1888 to the Fifty-first Congress. He was elected as a Democrat to the Fifty-third Congress (March 4, 1893 – March 3, 1895). He declined to be a candidate for renomination in 1894.

Later career and death 
He resumed the practice of medicine in East Liverpool, Ohio, and died there.  He is buried in Riverview Cemetery.

Family life 

He was married to Mary L. Hasson in 1873. She died in 1876, leaving a son, Frank H. Ikirt. He married Mary E. Holmes in 1880. She had five children.

References

 

1852 births
1927 deaths
People from East Liverpool, Ohio
19th-century American politicians
People from Columbiana County, Ohio
19th-century American physicians
20th-century American physicians
Ohio State University College of Medicine alumni
Democratic Party members of the United States House of Representatives from Ohio